Forest Hill is a suburb of Melbourne, Victoria, Australia, 18 km east of Melbourne's Central Business District, located within the City of Whitehorse local government area. Forest Hill recorded a population of 10,780 at the 2021 census.

Forest Hill was recently ranked 93rd on Melbourne's most liveable suburb list, which was higher than other nearby popular suburbs such as Bentleigh, Mount Waverley and Glen Waverley.

The suburb is primarily made up of low to medium density residential housing.

History
Forest Hill Post Office opened on 1 March 1874 in the then rural area. It closed in 1895, reopened in 1902 and closed in 1976. The Forest Hills Centre office opened in 1965 shortly after the centre opened and was renamed Forest Hill in 1985.

Until 1994, Forest Hill was a part of the City of Nunawading local government area, but in December 1994 became part of the City of Whitehorse following the amalgamation of the former cities of Box Hill, Victoria and Nunawading.

Demographics
In the 2016 census the population of Forest Hill was 10,626, approximately 52.5% female and 47.5% male.

The median/average age of the people in Forest Hill is 40 years of age.
56.6% of people living in the suburb of Forest Hill were born in Australia. The other top responses for country of birth were China (excludes SARs and Taiwan) 9.8%, India 3.4%, Malaysia 2.8%, Vietnam 2.4% and England 2.2%.

In Forest Hill 57.4% of people only spoke English at home. Other languages spoken at home included Mandarin 11.0%, Cantonese 6.8%, Greek 2.9%, Vietnamese 1.7% and Italian 1.7%. 47.6% of Forest Hill households spoke a language other than English.

The religious makeup of Forest Hill is No Religion, so described 33.1%, Catholic 20.2%, Not stated 7.6%, Anglican 7.5% and Buddhism 6.2%. Christianity was the largest religious group reported overall (50.8%) (this figure excludes not stated responses).

The median individual income is $582 per week and the median household income is $1344 per week.

The median rent in Forest Hill is $360 per week and the median mortgage repayment is $1950 per month.

Industry
Fremantle Media's Melbourne production facilities are located on Hawthorn Road Forest Hill, where the soap opera Neighbours is produced.

Education
Forest Hill has one school located within the suburb, Parkmore Primary School. Other public and private schools are located nearby in adjoining suburbs and within short walking distance: Burwood Heights Primary School, Forest Hill Secondary College, Emmaus Catholic College and St. Timothy's Catholic Primary School.

Sport
Local sport includes many regular events and team sports. The suburb has an Australian Rules football team, the Forest Hill Zebras, competing in the Eastern Football League.

Nunawading Aqualink is located within the suburb, (Husband Road) containing an indoor, olympic-size swimming pool and children's pool. It also has a football Club The Forest Hill Zebras (Australian Rules Div. 4 Eastern Football League) at the Forest Hill Reserve (Husband Road), and a cricket club the Forest Hill Zebras (various divisions) at Mahoneys Reserve (Mahoneys Road) which also includes various soccer clubs, a clinic, a table tennis club, multiple badminton clubs and the 2nd Tally Ho scouts.

Shopping
The Forest Hill Chase Shopping Centre includes a number of major retailers, such as Coles, Target, Harris Scarfe, JB Hi-Fi, Rebel Sport, TK Maxx, Aldi Woolworths, Hoyts Cinemas and a number of restaurants. There is also a Zone Bowling centre (formerly AMF) and Timezone.

See also
 City of Nunawading – Forest Hill was previously within this former local government area.

References

Suburbs of Melbourne
Suburbs of the City of Whitehorse